Li Li, born January 20, 1961, in Shanghai, China, currently residing in Stockholm, is a poet and literary translator.

Li studied Swedish at the University in Beijing and went to Sweden as an exchange student in 1988. Following Tiananmen Square Massacre in June, 1989, he decided to stay in Sweden. The same year he debuted with a collection of poetry in Swedish "Blick i vattnet". In China he is an acclaimed poet as well as translator of Swedish poetry to Chinese. For his work, he has received many literary distinctions, including recently Yinchuan Poetry Prize for his translations of Tranströmer into Chinese. In 2009, he received the Svenska Dagbladet Literature Prize for his collection Ursprunget.

Poetry 
Sömnlös (with Illustrations by Qiu Dali), 1988 (Shih-mien)
Blick i vattnet: dikter, 1989
Tidens tyngd: dikter, 1990
Att fly: dikter, 1994
Retur: dikter, 1995
En plats som är du: dikter, 1999
Ursprunget, 2007

Translations 
To Chinese from Swedish:
Yiwang de guitu (Den motsträviga skapelsen by Kjell Espmark), 1991
Telangsiteluomu shi quanji (Samlade dikter by Tomas Tranströmer), 2001

To Swedish from Chinese:
En tunga ska växa ut : ny kinesisk dikt, i översättning av Li Li och Göran Sommardal, 2007

Notes

External links 
 San Francisco International Poetry Festival page about Li Li

Swedish-language writers
Living people
People's Republic of China poets
Poets from Shanghai
People's Republic of China translators
20th-century Chinese translators
21st-century Chinese translators
Literary translators
Year of birth missing (living people)